Capron Park could refer to:

Capron Park in Uxbridge, Massachusetts, United States 
Capron Park in Attleboro, Massachusetts, United States

See also
Capron Park Zoo